The Krzysztof Penderecki Academy of Music in Kraków is a conservatory located in central Kraków, Poland. It is the alma mater of the renowned Polish contemporary composer Krzysztof Penderecki, who was also its rector for 15 years. The Academy is the only one in Poland to have two winners of the International Chopin Competition in Warsaw (Halina Czerny-Stefańska and Adam Harasiewicz) as well as a few further prize-winners among its alumni.

Historical background
The academy was founded in 1888 by the eminent Polish composer Władysław Żeleński thanks to his artistic connections and patronage of Princess Marcelina Czartoryska, a concert pianist and former pupil of Frédéric Chopin. Until 1945 it operated as a conservatory under the name of Conservatory of the Music Society or, the Cracow Conservatory. During the partitions of Poland, as the region of Lesser Poland and Kraków was ruled by the Austrian Empire – in the late 18th century, it was necessary to gain the consent of the Austrian administration and meet the imperial requirements set for all conservatoires. The newly opened school was inspected by Joseph Dachs and Johann Fuchs, both professors of the Vienna Conservatoire, and received their enthusiastic opinion. It enjoyed a period of great growth in the twenty years between the two wars under directors Wiktor Barabasz and Boleslaw Wallek-Walewski.

The professorial staff included such names as Zbigniew Drzewiecki, Jan Gall, Zdzisław Jachimecki, Egon Petri and Severin Eisenberger.

Closed during the Nazi occupation of 1939-1945, especially after Sonderaktion Krakau in 1939, the conservatoire continued its activity underground and finally reopened on 1 September 1945, becoming the State Higher School of Music as of 1 February 1946 under its first rector, Prof. Zbigniew Drzewiecki. In 1979 it gained the rank of an Academy of Music. On 1 October 2000 the academy inaugurated its new premises at 41-43, St. Thomas Street (ul. Sw. Tomasza).

Structure

Composition, Interpretation and Music Education Faculty 
Composition Department
Conducting Department
Music Theory and Interpretation Department
Music and Education Research Department
Choral Department
Religious Music Department
Electroacoustic Music Studio

Instrumental Faculty
Piano Department
Organ Department
Early Music Department
Guitar and Harp Department
Violin and Viola Department
Cello and Double Bass Department
Woodwinds and Accordicon Department
Brass Department
Jazz Department
Percussion and Contemporary Music Department
Chamber Music Department

Voice and Drama Faculty 
Voice Department

People associated with the academy

Notable alumni

The list does not include graduates who later became staff of the Academy.
Sylvia Čápová-Vizváry, pianist
Halina Czerny-Stefańska (pianist)
Janina Garscia (composer)
Adam Harasiewicz (pianist)
Jan Hoffman (pianist)
Kazimierz Kord (conductor)
Adam Kopyciński (conductor)
Abel Korzeniowski (film music composer)
Waldemar Maciszewski (pianist)
Władysława Markiewiczówna (pianist)
Elżbieta Szmytka (soprano)
Wacław Kiełtyka (accordionist, guitarist)

From postgraduate studies
Lidia Grychtołówna (pianist)
Wojciech Kilar (composer)
Marzena Diakun (conductor)

Notable faculty

Academics before World War II
Zbigniew Drzewiecki
Jan Gall
Zdzisław Jachimecki
Egon Petri
Severin Eisenberger

Academics after 1945
Also graduated from the Academy:
Marcel Chyrzyński (composer)
Jerzy Katlewicz (conductor)
Krzysztof Meyer (composer)
Krzysztof Penderecki (composer)
Andrzej Pikul (pianist)
Paweł Przytocki (conductor)
Bogusław Schaeffer (composer)
Stanisław Skrowaczewski (conductor)
Regina Smendzianka (pianist)
Jadwiga Szamotulska (pianist)

Non-graduates
Peter Holtslag (recorder and flauto traverso player)
Stefan Kisielewski (composer)
Bolesław Kon (pianist)
Roman Palester (composer)
Katarzyna Popowa-Zydroń (pianist)
Ada Sari (singer)
Jadwiga Szamotulska (pianist)
Eugenia Umińska (violinist)
Bolesław Woytowicz (composer and pianist)
Tadeusz Żmudziński (pianist)

Doctors honoris causa
 1994 – Krzysztof Penderecki
 1997 – Paul Sacher
 2001 – Mieczysław Tomaszewski
 2003 – Helmuth Rilling
 2005 – Peter Lukas Graf
 2007 – Krystyna Moszumańska-Nazar
 2008 – Henryk Mikołaj Górecki
 2013 – Paul Badura-Skoda
 2015 – Pope Benedict XVI
 2016 - Kaja Danczowska
 2017 - Iwan Monighetti
 2019 - Barbara Świątek-Żelazna
 2022 - Anne-Sophie Mutter

See also
 Culture of Kraków

Notes and references

 
Universities and colleges in Kraków
Music schools in Poland
Educational institutions established in 1888
1888 establishments in Austria-Hungary